Ruthven Bluff is a large rock bluff 1 nautical mile (1.9 km) south of Sosa Bluff in the Schneider Hills portion of the Argentina Range, Pensacola Mountains. Mapped by United States Geological Survey (USGS) from surveys and U.S. Navy air photos, 1956–67. Named by Advisory Committee on Antarctic Names (US-ACAN) for Richard W. Ruthven, USGS surveyor who visited the bluff in the 1965–66 season.

References

Cliffs of Queen Elizabeth Land